Csák was the name of a gens (Latin for "clan"; nemzetség in Hungarian) in the Kingdom of Hungary.

Origin
The Gesta Hunnorum et Hungarorum ("Deeds of the Huns and Hungarians") records that the ancestor of the family was Szabolcs, son of chieftain Előd, the leader of one of the seven Magyar tribes.

The gens divided into 12 branches and several families in the course of the centuries. The Csáky de Mihály family also belongs to the Csák gens.

Notable members of the clan
Csák, ancestor and denominator of the gens Csák
Ugrin (12th century), ispán

Ugod branch
The numbering means within the branch.
 Luka
 Demetrius I (fl. 1217–1254), judge royal (1233–1234; 1242–1245)
 Ugod (fl. 1264–1270)
 Demetrius II (fl. 1277–1285; d. before 1287), wildgrave of Bakony (1281); married N Kőszegi
 Blessed Maurice (d. 20 March 1336), Dominican friar
 Csák II (d. before 1309), last male descendant
 Kunigunda or Kingus (fl. 1317), married Julius II Rátót
 (?) Michael (fl. 1270–1277), ispán of Nyitra County (according to Pál Engel)
 Unknown daughter (fl. 1232), married Csépán II Győr
 Csák I (fl. 1264–1270), wildgrave of Bakony (1270)
 (?) Adam
 Paul
 Peter (fl. c. 1305)

Kisfalud branch
 Ugrin (d. 1204), archbishop of Esztergom, maybe son of ispán Ugrin
 Nicholas, his testament of 1231 mentions archbishop Ugrin as his pater, but more likely that he was Nicholas' uncle

Dobóc (Orbova) branch
The numbering means within the branch.
 Peter I
 Dominic I (fl. 1262–1300), palatine for younger king Stephen (1266)
 Nicholas (fl. 1280)
 John ("the Red", fl. 1323)
 Michael II (fl. 1323)
 Stephen I ("Cimba", fl. 1280–1322)
 Dominic II (fl. 1325–1338, d. before 1351)
 Csala (fl. 1355)
 Clara (fl. 1355)
 Anna (fl. 1355–1356)
 Bagó (fl. 1355–1356)
 Peter III (fl. 1328–1351)
 Stephen II (fl. 1351–1356), died without descendants
 Peter II (fl. 1280, d. before 1308), married N, daughter of comes Ladislaus
 Michael I (fl. 1264–1277), ispán of Veszprém County (1272)
 Simon (fl. 1267)
 Beers (fl. 1267)

Újlak branch
The numbering means within the branch.
 Bás I, ispán
 Bás II
 Csák
 John (d. before 1324), judge royal (1311–1314)
 Ugrin II, archbishop of Spalato (1244–1248)
 Pós, master of the treasury for prince (1227–1233) then King Béla IV (1235), ban of Severin (1235)
 Ugrin III (c. 1240–1311), oligarch, judge royal, Voivode of Transylvania, Ban of Szörény, Macsó, master of the treasury, master of the horse
 Nicholas (d. 1359), judge royal (1359)
 Ladislaus (d. before 1364), last member
 Ugrin I (d. 1241), archbishop of Kalocsa, killed in the battle of Mohi

Trencsén branch
The numbering means within the branch.
 Matthew I (d. 1245/1249), first known member of the branch, master of the treasury (1242–1245)
 Mark I, ispán of Hont County (1247)
 Peter II (fl. 1279–1290)
 Stephen II (fl. 1279–1307)
 Mark II (fl. 1309)
 Peter III (fl. 1309–1332; d. before 1350), master of the horse (1314–1317)
 Ladislaus (fl. 1332)
 Peter IV (fl. 1332)
 Dominic (fl. 1332–1359), ancestor of the Dombai family
 Stephen III (fl. 1323–1329)
 Unknown daughter, married Roland III Rátót
 Maria (fl. 1301), married Ivánka Hont-Pázmány, then Zoeardus Zoárd
 Unknown daughter, married Jakab Cseszneky (1) and Lőrinte from the kindred Lőrinte (?)
 Stephen I, master of the stewards (1275–1276; 1277–1278)
 Matthew II (d. 1284), palatine, voivode of Transylvania, judge royal, ban of Slavonia, master of the treasury
 Peter I (d. 1284), palatine, master of the stewards
 Matthew III (1260/65 – 1321), master of the horse (1293–1296), palatine (1296–1297, 1302–1310) and master of the treasury (1310–1311)
 Matthew IV (d. before 1318), married Gutha N
 Matthew V, married Kunigunda
 James
 Unknown daughter, wife of Desoh
 Csák (fl. 1291–1300), bearer of the sword (1293)

Kendertó branch
The numbering means within the branch.
 Nicholas I
 Matthew I (fl. 1263)
 Nicholas II (fl. 1315–1336; d. before 1367), died without male descendants
 Matthew II (fl. 1336)
 Ladislaus (fl. 1336)
 Catherine (fl. 1336–1367), heir, married Demetrius Málasi
 Nicholas III (fl. 1367), canon of Fehérvár
 Michael (fl. 1367)
 Anne (fl. 1398), married Francis Apáti
 Elizabeth (fl. 1383), married Klemens, a citizen of Fehérvár
 a possible daughter

Nadab branch

Fragments
Gúg I
Csák (fl. 1219–1246), ispán of Sopron County (1235–1240)
Stephen (fl. 1228–1269, d. before 1276), Ban of Severin (1243); married N Győr
Emeric (fl. 1272–1276), ispán of Somogy County (1272–1273)
Gúg II (fl. 1237–1263)
four other unidentified sons (fl. 1237)

References 

 Kristó, Gyula (editor): Korai Magyar Történeti Lexikon - 9-14. század (Encyclopedia of the Early Hungarian History - 9-14th centuries); Akadémiai Kiadó, 1994, Budapest; .

 

fr:Famille Csáky